The Danish-owned cargo ship MV Danica White was hijacked and maneuvered into Somali waters on 1 June 2007. On 3 June 2007, a  engaged the pirates, firing machine-gun bursts at the skiffs in tow behind the Danish ship, but failed to stop them. Following 83 days in captivity, the crew of five and the ship were released after the owner, H. Folmer & Co, paid a ransom of 723,000 United States dollars, which was negotiated down from  $1.5 million.

References

Maritime incidents in 2007
Piracy in Somalia
Merchant ships of Denmark
Bulk carriers
1985 ships